In Norse mythology, Mögþrasir (Old Norse:  , possibly meaning "the one who is striving for sons") is a jötunn who is solely attested in stanza 49 of the poem Vafþrúðnismál from the Poetic Edda.

Vafþrúðnismál 
Mögþrasir is mentioned during the contest of wisdom between Odin and the giant Vafþrúðnir (here anglicized as Mogthrasir):

Theories 
According to Carolyne Larrington, the identities of these maidens are uncertain but they are probably the Norns. If this is the case, then Mögþrasir is either their father or is being used as a kenning to indicate the Norns' kinship with the jötnar.

Notes

References 
 Larrington, Carolyne (transl.) (1996). The Poetic Edda. Oxford World's Classics. 
 Simek, Rudolf (2007) translated by Angela Hall. Dictionary of Northern Mythology. D.S. Brewer. 

Jötnar